This is a list of American soccer transfers for the 2008 Major League Soccer season.

Chivas USA 
This is a list of transfers for CD Chivas USA.

In 
 Jim Curtin Traded from Chicago Fire
 Alecko Eskandarian Traded from Real Salt Lake
 Atiba Harris Traded from Real Salt Lake for a third-round SuperDraft pick 
 Keith Savage Drafted 43rd overall in the 2008 MLS Superdraft
 Raphaël Wicky Acquired from  FC Sion
 Zach Thornton Traded from New York Red Bulls for future considerations

Out
 Jason Hernandez Lost to San Jose Earthquakes in the Expansion Draft
 Tony Barrera Traded to San Jose Earthquakes
 Preston Burpo Traded to San Jose Earthquakes for a fourth round SuperDraft pick.
 David Arvizu Waived
 Carlos Borja Waived
 Desmond Brooks Waived
 Carlos Llamosa Waived
 Rodrigo López Waived, later signed with Ventura County Fusion
 Laurent Merlin Waived
 Justin Myers Waived
 Ramón Núñez Waived later signed with  Olimpia
 Orlando Pérez Waived
 Eder Robles Waived, later signed with Hollywood United
 Mohammed Sethi Waived
 Erasmo Solorzano Waived, later signed with Bakersfield Brigade
 Brad Guzan Transferred to  Aston Villa

Chicago Fire
This is a list of transfers for the Chicago Fire.

In
 Patrick Nyarko Drafted 7th overall in 2008 MLS Superdraft
 Dominic Cervi Drafted 12th overall in 2008 MLS Superdraft
 Peter Lowry Drafted 26th overall in 2008 MLS Superdraft
 Dwight Barnett Drafted 38th overall in 2008 MLS Superdraft
 Stephen King Drafted 40th overall in 2008 MLS Superdraft
 Austin Washington Drafted 54th overall in 2008 MLS Superdraft
 Andy Herron Rights acquired from Columbus Crew for 4th round pick in the 2010 Superdraft 
 Tomasz Frankowski  Signed from  Wolverhampton Wanderers
 Brandon Prideaux Acquired in waiver draft from Colorado Rapids
 Líder Mármol Signed as free agent.
 Brian McBride Received rights in trade with Toronto FC

Out
 Matt Pickens To  Queens Park Rangers
 Iván Guerrero Lost to San Jose Earthquakes in the Expansion Draft
 Jim Curtin Traded to Chivas USA
 Chris Armas Retired
 Paulo Wanchope Retired
 Jeff Curtin Waived, later signed with D.C. United
 Osei Telesford Waived, later signed with  Puerto Rico Islanders
 Chad Barrett Traded to Toronto FC in Brian McBride deal

Colorado Rapids
This is a list of transfers for the Colorado Rapids.

In
 José Burciaga, Jr Traded from Kansas City Wizards for a 2009 Second Round Draft Pick 
 Ciaran O'Brien Drafted 5th overall in 2008 MLS Superdraft
 Adrian Chevannes Drafted 36th overall in 2008 MLS Superdraft
 Brian Grazier Drafted 47th overall in 2008 MLS Superdraft
 Scott Campbell Drafted 49th overall in 2008 MLS Superdraft
 Chase Hilgenbrinck Acquired from  Ñublense
 Christian Gómez Acquired from D.C. United
 Tam McManus Acquired from  Dunfermline Athletic
 Preston Burpo Traded from San Jose Earthquakes for 2009 draft pick
 Greg Dalby Acquired on free transfer
 Cory Gibbs Acquired on free transfer

Out
 Daniel Osorno signed with  Dorados de Sinaloa
 Zach ThorntonWaived, later signed with New York Red Bulls
 José Cancela Waived, later signed with  Fénix
 Tony Sanneh Waived

Columbus Crew
This is a list of transfers for the Columbus Crew.

In
 Brian Carroll  Traded from San Jose Earthquakes for  Kei Kamara
 Andy Iro Drafted 6th overall in 2008 MLS Superdraft
 George Josten Drafted 20th overall in 2008 MLS Superdraft
 Ricardo Pierre-Louis Drafted 22nd overall in 2008 MLS Superdraft
 Ryan Miller Drafted 31st overall in 2008 MLS Superdraft
 Steven Lenhart Drafted 48th overall in 2008 MLS Superdraft
 Guilherme Só
 Gino Padula Acquired from  Montpellier HSC
 Pat Noonan Free Agent

Out
 Ned Grabavoy Lost to San Jose Earthquakes in the Expansion Draft
Kei Kamara Traded to San Jose Earthquakes for  Brian Carroll
 Ben Hunter Waived, later signed with Richmond Kickers
 Marcos González To  Universidad Católica
 Jacob Thomas Waived
 Andy Herron Traded to Chicago Fire for 4th round pick in the 2010 Superdraft
 Brandon Moss Retired
 Andrei Pacheco Waived, later signed with  W Connection

D.C. United
This is a list of transfers for D.C. United.

In
 Zach Wells Traded from Houston Dynamo for  Bobby Boswell
 Ryan Cordeiro Drafted 33rd overall in 2008 MLS Superdraft
 Franco Niell Loan from  Argentinos Juniors
 Gonzalo Martínez From  Millonarios
 Marcelo Gallardo From  Paris Saint-Germain
 José Carvallo Loan from  Universitario de Deportes
 Gonzalo Peralta Acquired from  Club Almirante Brown
 Dan Stratford Drafted 24th overall in the 2008 MLS Supplemental Draft
 James Thorpe Drafted 52nd overall in the 2008 MLS Supplemental Draft
 Quavas Kirk Acquired from Los Angeles Galaxy for Greg Vanney
 Pat Carroll Signed as a discovery player
 Santino Quaranta Signed as a free agent from New York Red Bulls
 Jeff Curtin Picked up in waiver draft from Chicago Fire
 Jeremy Barlow Traded from Houston Dynamo
 Dane Murphy Signed after a successful trial
 Mike Zaher From Toronto FC
 Francis Doe Free agent
 Craig Thompson From Houston Dynamo
 Joe Vide Free agent
 Iván Guerrero Traded from San Jose Earthquakes for partial allocation
 Louis Crayton From  FC Basel
 Thabiso Khumalo Acquired from Pittsburgh Riverhounds
 Greg Janicki Acquired from Pittsburgh Riverhounds
 Ibrahim Koroma Acquired from  Kallon F.C.
 Ryan Miller Acquired off waivers from Columbus Crew

Out
 Brian Carroll  Lost to San Jose Earthquakes in 2007 MLS Expansion Draft
 Brad North  Waived
 Shawn Crowe Waived
 Mira Mupier Waived, later signed with  Jetsmark IF
 Kiki Willis Waived
 Bobby Boswell Traded to Houston Dynamo for  Zach Wells and 2009 draft pick
 Troy Perkins To  Vålerenga I.F.
 Jay Nolly Waived, later signed with  Vancouver Whitecaps
 Nicholas Addlery Waived, later signed with  Vancouver Whitecaps
 Bryan Arguez To  Hertha Berlin
 Stephen deRoux Waived, later signed with Minnesota Thunder
 Christian Gómez Traded to Colorado Rapids
 Joshua Gros Retired
 Greg Vanney Traded to Los Angeles Galaxy for  Quavas Kirk
 Jerson Monteiro Waived, later signed with Atlanta Silverbacks
 Jamil Walker Waived, later signed with Carolina RailHawks
 Guy-Roland Kpene Waived, later signed with Houston Dynamo
 Jeff Curtin Retired
 Franco Niell Waived
 José Carvallo Waived
 Jeremy Barlow Waived, later signed with Los Angeles Galaxy
 Dan Stratford Waived
 Dane Murphy Waived

FC Dallas
This is a list of transfers for FC Dallas.

In
 Duilio Davino Loan from  Club América
 Brek Shea Drafted 2nd overall in the 2008 MLS SuperDraft
 Josh Lambo Drafted 8th overall in the 2008 MLS SuperDraft
 Eric Avila Drafted 19th overall in the 2008 MLS SuperDraft
 Jamil Roberts Drafted 45th overall in the 2008 MLS SuperDraft
 Ben Nason Drafted 50th overall in the 2008 MLS SuperDraft
 André Rocha Loan from  Clube Atletico Paranaense
  Jeff Cunningham Traded from Toronto FC for a 2009 3rd Round MLS Superdraft pick

Out
 Clarence Goodson Lost to San Jose Earthquakes in the Expansion Draft
 Denilson Released
 Carlos Ruíz Traded to Los Angeles Galaxy for allocation money and a 2009 SuperDraft pick
 Shaka Hislop Retired
 Juan Botero Waived, later signed with  CD Atlético Huila
 Chris Gbandi To  FK Haugesund
 Abdus Ibrahim Traded to Toronto FC
 Juan Carlos Toja Transferred to  FC Steaua București 
 Arturo Alvarez Traded to San Jose Earthquakes

Houston Dynamo
This is a list of transfers for the Houston Dynamo.

In
 Bobby Boswell Traded from D.C. United for  Zach Wells and 2009 draft pick
 Geoff Cameron 2008 MLS SuperDraft 3rd Round Pick
 Jeremy Barlow 2008 MLS SuperDraft 4th Round Pick
 Franco Caraccio Signed from  Arsenal de Sarandí
 Tony Caig Signed from  Gretna F.C.
 Guy-Roland Kpene Signed from D.C. United
 Nate Jaqua Resigned, Contract expired from  SCR Altach
 Kei Kamara Traded from San Jose Earthquakes for a draft pick and allocation

Out
 Ryan Cochrane Lost to San Jose Earthquakes in the Expansion Draft
 Kenneth Hoerner Waived
 Jordan James Waived
 Zach Wells Traded to D.C. United for  Bobby Boswell 
 Paul Dalglish Released, Later moved to  Kilmarnock
 Joseph Ngwenya To  SK Austria Kärnten
 Nate Jaqua To  SCR Altach
 Franco Caraccio Released, Later moved to  All Boys

Kansas City Wizards
This is a list of transfers for the Kansas City Wizards.

In
 Chance Myers Defender selected #1 in the 2008 MLS SuperDraft from UCLA
 Roger Espinoza Midfielder selected #11 in the 2008 MLS SuperDraft from Ohio State
 Yomby William Defender selected #23 in the 2008 MLS SuperDraft from Old Dominion
 Jonathan Leathers Defender selected #25 in the 2008 MLS SuperDraft from Furman
 Matt Marquess Defender selected #39 in the 2008 MLS SuperDraft from Santa Clara
 Rauwshan McKenzie Defender selected #53 in the 2008 MLS SuperDraft from Michigan State
 Claudio López Signed as a Designated Player on a Free Transfer
 Josh Wolff Free Agent
 Iván Trujillo From  La Equidad

Out
 Edson Elcock Waived, later signed with  Puerto Rico Islanders A.J. Godbolt Waived, later signed with Austin Aztex U23 Willy Guadarrama Waived, later signed with Austin Aztex U23 Chris KonopkaWaived, later signed with   Bohemians Nick Garcia Traded to San Jose Earthquakes for #1 2008 MLS Superdraft Pick Jose Burciaga Jr Traded to Colorado Rapids for 2009 second round Superdraft Pick Eddie Johnson To  Fulham F.C Will John To  Randers FCLos Angeles Galaxy
This is a list of transfers for the Los Angeles Galaxy.

In
 Clint Mathis Traded from New York Red Bulls for a third round SuperDraft pick Carlos Ruíz Traded from FC Dallas for allocation money and a 2009 SuperDraft pick Sean Franklin Drafted 4th overall in 2008 MLS Superdraft Ely Allen Drafted 21st overall in 2008 MLS Superdraft Julian Valentin Drafted 29th overall in 2008 MLS Superdraft Matt Allen Drafted 34th overall in 2008 MLS Superdraft Brandon McDonald Drafted 46th overall in 2008 MLS Superdraft Matt Hatzke Drafted 51st overall in 2008 MLS Superdraft Celestine Babayaro Free Agent Eduardo Domínguez Acquired from Club Atlético Huracán Eddie Lewis Acquired from Derby CountyOut
 Gavin Glinton  Lost to San Jose Earthquakes in the Expansion Draft Joe Cannon Traded to San Jose Earthquakes for a partial allocation.   Chris Albright  Traded to New England Revolution for salary cap allocation Cobi Jones Retired Mike Caso Waived Lance Friesz Waived Carlos PavónWaived, later signed with   Real España Kyle Veris Waived, later signed with   IL Hødd Clint Mathis To  Ergotelis F.C. Kevin Harmse Traded to Toronto FC for 2009 MLS Superdraft pick (4th round) Celestine Babayaro Waived Abel Xavier Waived Carlos Ruíz Traded to Toronto FC for 2009 MLS Supplementary Draft picks (1st and 2nd rounds)New England Revolution
This is a list of transfers for the New England Revolution.

In
 Mauricio Castro Acquired from  Club Deportivo Olimpia Argenis Fernández Acquired from  Santos de Guápiles José Angulo Allocated by MLS as a discovery player Chris Albright Traded from Los Angeles Galaxy for salary cap allocation Rob Valentino Drafted 13th overall in the 2008 SuperDraft Michael Videira Drafted 18th overall in the 2008 SuperDraft Joe Germanese Drafted 27th overall in the 2008 SuperDraft Matt Britner Drafted 41st overall in the 2008 SuperDraft Spencer Wadsworth Drafted 55th overall in the 2008 SuperDraft Kheli Dube Drafted 8th overall in the 2008 MLS Supplemental Draft Chris Tierney Drafted 13th overall in the 2008 MLS Supplemental Draft Kyle Altman Drafted 27th overall in the 2008 MLS Supplemental Draft Saidi Isaac Drafted 41st overall in the 2008 MLS Supplemental Draft, later returned to play for Indiana InvadersOut
 James Riley Lost to San Jose Earthquakes in the Expansion Draft Willie Sims Waived, later signed with Miami FC Marshall Leonard Waived Miguel Gonzalez Waived Chris Loftus  Waived, later signed with  Bunkeflo IF Bryan Byrne Waived, later signed with Ventura County Fusion Andy Dorman Free transfer to  St Mirren F.C. Pat Noonan Free transfer to  Aalesunds FK Matt Britner WaivedNew York Red Bulls
This is a list of transfers for New York Red Bulls.

In
 Zach Thornton Free agent Eric Brunner Drafted 16th overall in 2008 MLS Superdraft Luke Sassano Drafted 32nd overall in 2008 MLS Superdraft David Roth Drafted 44th overall in 2008 MLS Superdraft Oscar Echeverry Free agent Danleigh Borman Drafted 7th overall in 2008 MLS Supplemental Draft Michael Palacio Drafted 21st overall in 2008 MLS Supplemental Draft John Gilkerson Drafted 35th overall in 2008 MLS Supplemental Draft Caleb Patterson-Sewell Free agent Kevin Mesa Free agent Ricky Schramm Free agent Chris Megaloudis Free agent Andrew Boyens Free agent Gordon Klejstan
 Jorge Rojas Free agent Juan Pietravallo Free agent DiegoJiménez Free agent Gabriel Cichero On loan from Deportivo Italia Matthew Mbuta Acquired from Crystal Palace Baltimore Macoumba Kandji $25,000 loan from Atlanta Silverbacks. If the loan was a success, then another fee of $150,000 would be paid for Kandji, making the total amount paid $175,000.Out
 Clint Mathis Traded to Los Angeles Galaxy for a third round SuperDraft pick Joe Vide Drafted by San Jose Earthquakes in the Expansion Draft Blake Camp Waived, later signed with Atlanta Silverbacks Ronald Waterreus Retired Markus Schopp Retired Santino Quaranta Waived, later signed with D.C. United Sal Caccavale Waived Randi Patterson Waived, later signed with Charleston Battery Chris Karcz Waived, later signed with Newark Ironbound Express Elie Ikangu Waived Francis Doe Waived, later signed with D.C. United Dema Kovalenko Traded to Real Salt Lake for undisclosed 2010 MLS Superdraft pick Jerrod Laventure Waived, later signed with Newark Ironbound Express Eric Brunner Released, later signed with Miami FC Jozy Altidore Transferred to  Villarreal for $10,000,000 Kevin Mesa Released Claudio Reyna Retired Ricky Schramm Waived Zach Thornton Traded to CD Chivas USA for future considerationsReal Salt Lake
This is a list of transfers for Real Salt Lake.

In
 Ian Joy Free transfer from  FC St. Pauli Kenny Deuchar Free transfer from  Gretna F.C. Jámison Olave Loan from  Deportivo Cali Matías Córdoba Loan from  Argentinos Juniors Tony Beltran Drafted 3rd overall in 2008 MLS SuperDraft Alex Nimo Drafted 17th overall in 2008 MLS SuperDraft David Horst  Drafted 14th overall in 2008 MLS SuperDraft Brennan Tennelle Drafted 37th overall in 2008 MLS SuperDraftOut
 Eddie Pope Retired Chris Brown Waived, later signed with Portland Timbers Steven Curfman Waived, later signed with Carolina RailHawks Christian Jimenez Waived Jean-Martial Kipre Waived Jack Stewart Waived, later signed with  Moss FK Atiba Harris Traded to CD Chivas USA for a third-round SuperDraft pick  Jamie Watson Waived, later signed with Austin Aztex U23 Alecko EskandarianTraded to Chivas USA for allocation moneySan Jose Earthquakes
This is a list of transfers for the San Jose Earthquakes.

In
  Arturo Alvarez - Trade with FC Dallas  Mikel Arce - Signed from CD Lourdes  Jay Ayres - Signed from Belmont University  Tim Bohnenkamp - Drafted 15th overall in 2008 MLS Supplemental Draft  Dan Benton - Signed from Charlotte Eagles  Preston Burpo - Trade with CD Chivas USA  Joe Cannon - Trade with Los Angeles Galaxy  Brian Carroll - Expansion draft pick from D.C. United  Ryan Cochrane - Expansion draft pick from Houston Dynamo  Ramiro Corrales - Trade with Houston Dynamo for league rights after return from SK Brann  John Cunliffe - Trade with CD Chivas USA  Greg Curry - Drafted 29th overall in 2008 MLS Supplemental Draft  Eric Denton - Signed from New York Red Bulls  Nick Garcia - Trade with Kansas City Wizards  Michael Ghebru - Signed from Eintracht Frankfurt  Gavin Glinton - Expansion draft pick from Los Angeles Galaxy  Clarence Goodson - Expansion draft pick from FC Dallas  Ned Grabavoy - Expansion draft pick from Columbus Crew  Kelly Gray - Trade with Colorado Rapids  Iván Guerrero - Expansion draft pick from Chicago Fire  Michael Gustavson - Signed from Clayton State University  Matt Hatzke - Signed from Santa Clara University  Jason Hernandez - Expansion draft pick from CD Chivas USA  Darren Huckerby - Trade with Toronto FC for league rights from Norwich City F.C.  Peguero Jean Philippe - Loan from Brøndby IF  Tim Jepson - Drafted 43rd overall in 2008 MLS Supplemental Draft  Ryan Johnson - Signed from New Jersey Ironmen  Kei Kamara - Trade with Columbus Crew  Jovan Kirovski - Trade with Colorado Rapids  Francisco Lima - Signed from Brescia Calcio  Ronnie O'Brien - Trade with Toronto FC  Chris Pozniak - Expansion draft pick from Toronto FC  James Riley - Expansion draft pick from New England Revolution  Jamil Roberts - Trade with FC Dallas  Shea Salinas - Drafted 15th overall in 2008 MLS SuperDraft  Scott Sealy - Trade with Kansas City Wizards  Adam Smarte - Drafted 1st overall in 2008 MLS Supplemental Draft  Davide Somma - Signed from Olbia Calcio  Joe Vide - Expansion draft pick from New York Red BullsOut
  Dan Benton - Waived  Tim Bohnenkamp - Waived  Preston Burpo - Traded to Colorado Rapids  Brian Carroll - Traded to Columbus Crew  Greg Curry - Waived  Clarence Goodson - Signed with IK Start  Iván Guerrero - Traded to D.C. United  Peguero Jean Philippe - Canceled loan with Brøndby IF  Tim Jepson - Waived  Kei Kamara - Traded to Houston Dynamo  Chris Pozniak - Traded to CD Chivas USA  Joe Vide - Traded to D.C. UnitedToronto FC
This is a list of transfers for Toronto FC.

In
 Julius James Picked 9th overall in the 2008 MLS Superdraft Pat Phelan  Picked 10th overall in the 2008 MLS Superdraft Brian Edwards Picked in the 2nd round of the 2008 MLS Superdraft Mike Zaher Picked in the 3rd round of the 2008 MLS Superdraft Joseph Lapira Picked in the 3rd round of the 2008 MLS Superdraft Xavier Balc Picked 2nd overall in 2008 MLS Supplemental Draft Kevin Harmse Acquired from Los Angeles Galaxy for 2009 MLS Superdraft pick (4th round) Tyler Rosenlund Signed as a free agent Jarrod Smith Signed as a free agent Marco Vélez Free transfer from  Puerto Rico Islanders Laurent Robert Free transfer from  Derby County Amado Guevara Traded from Chivas USA for a 2009 and 2010 draft pick Rohan Ricketts Free transfer from  Barnsley Olivier Tébily Free transfer from  Birmingham City Abdus Ibrahim Traded from FC Dallas for a 2009 draft pick Chad Barrett Traded from Chicago Fire for Brian McBride Johann Smith "Free transfer from  Bolton Wanderers
 Carlos Ruíz Traded from Los Angeles Galaxy for 2009 MLS Supplementary Draft picks (1st and 2nd rounds)Out
 Maurice Edu transferred to  Rangers F.C. for a fee of $5,000,000 Chris Pozniak Lost to San Jose Earthquakes in Expansion Draft Adam Braz  Waived, later signed with Montreal Impact Miguel Canizalez Waived Srdjan Djekanovic  Waived, later signed with Vancouver Whitecaps David Guzmán Waived, later signed with Chicago Fire Premier Stephen Lumley Waived Cristian Nuñez  Waived, later signed with Montreal Impact Marco Reda  Waived, later signed with Charleston Battery Kenny Stamatopoulos Loan return to  Tromsø IL Pat Phelan Waived Mike Zaher Waived Joseph Lapira Waived Ronnie O'Brien Traded to San Jose Earthquakes for 2009 MLS Superdraft pick (1st round) and partial allocation Andrew Boyens Waived, signed by New York Red Bulls  Jeff Cunningham Traded to FC Dallas for a 2009 MLS Superdraft (3rd Round) pick Laurent Robert Waived Olivier Tébily Waived''

External links 
 Major League Soccer's official website

2008

Major League Soccer
Major League Soccer